Jebsheim is a commune in the Haut-Rhin department in Grand Est in north-eastern France.

During WWII in fighting over the Colmar Pocket, which included Jebsheim, Audie Murphy was awarded the Medal of Honor.

See also
 Communes of the Haut-Rhin département
 Colmar Pocket

References

Communes of Haut-Rhin